Tai Hing Group is a multi-brand restaurant chain in Hong Kong. It was listed on the Hong Kong Stock Exchange in June 2019. The company was founded in 1989 by Mr Chan Wing On and Mr. Yuen Chi Ming.  

With years of development, the management has integrated traditional and innovative business philosophy, also adopting multi-brand business model when expanding the market, that let Tai Hing gradually expanded from a siu mei style restaurant to one of the largest multi-brand casual dining restaurant operators in Hong Kong, and established a chain of over 200 restaurants network in Hong Kong, Mainland China and Macau. In addition to our flagship “Tai Hing” brand, we grown our brand portfolio through in-house development, acquisitions and licensing including “TeaWood”, "Trusty Congee King”, “Men Wah Bing Teng”, “Phở Lê”, “Rice Rule”, “King Fong Bing Teng", “Asam Chicken Rice”, “Dao Cheng”, “Dimpot”, “Dumpling Station" ,“FanFanStore" , “Lu Bistro"  , “Yung Fong Café " ,“Peppercorn" ,“Tommy Yummy"  , “Pepper Mansion" and “Tori Yoichi"

References

Companies listed on the Hong Kong Stock Exchange
Restaurant chains in Hong Kong
Hong Kong brands
Restaurants established in 1989
1989 establishments in Hong Kong
2019 initial public offerings